This is a list of members of the Australian Capital Territory Legislative Assembly from 1998 to 2001:

 Although Dave Rugendyke was elected on the Osborne Independent Group ticket, he took his place in the Assembly as an independent, separate from any party grouping.
 Though Michael Moore was elected as an independent, he joined Kate Carnell's Liberal government as a minister on 28 April 1998. Despite this, he continued to sit in the Assembly as an independent.
 Trevor Kaine resigned from the Liberal Party on 13 May 1998. On 28 May, he announced that he would stand as a representative of the "Canberra Liberals", but then, on 30 July, registered the United Canberra Party, which he represented for the remainder of his term.
 Liberal member Kate Carnell resigned from the Assembly on 17 October 2000. The vacancy was filled by Liberal Jacqui Burke.

See also
1998 Australian Capital Territory general election

Members of Australian Capital Territory parliaments by term
21st-century Australian politicians
20th-century Australian politicians